WZAW-LD (channel 33) is a low-power television station in Wausau, Wisconsin, United States, affiliated with the Fox network. It is owned by Gray Television alongside CBS affiliate WSAW-TV (channel 7). The two stations share studios on Grand Avenue/US 51 in Wausau; WZAW-LD's transmitter is located northeast of Nutterville in unincorporated Marathon County.

Overview
Since WZAW transmits at low-power, its signal does not reach Rhinelander or other areas to the north and east (such as Eagle River and Crandon), which would have caused complications, especially for Fox's broadcasts of NFL games, including games of the Green Bay Packers. Therefore, the station is simulcast on WSAW's third digital subchannel in 720p high definition to increase its over-the-air broadcasting radius. This signal broadcasts on channel 7.3 from a transmitter on Rib Mountain. It is also seen on WSAW's Sayner translator, W21DS-D3, which also maps to channel 7.3.

History
On July 1, 2015, Gray bought the non-license assets of the market's previous Fox affiliate WFXS-DT (owned by Davis Television, LLC). Due to Federal Communications Commission (FCC) ownership restrictions, Gray established this new low-powered station to become the new Fox affiliate. All of WFXS' program streams including its existing PSIP channel numbering was then moved to WZAW. Subsequently, WFXS ceased broadcasting after nearly sixteen years on-the-air and its studios on North 3rd Street in Wausau were shut down.

In consenting to the interference that would be caused by WZAW operating under special temporary authority on channel 31 (the same RF channel as WFXS) rather than its licensed channel 33, Davis Television stated that it would return the WFXS license to the FCC for cancellation following the sale. In August 2015, WSAW launched a prime time newscast on this Fox outlet known as WZAW News at 9. The half-hour broadcast offers direct competition to WAOW's thirty-minute, weeknight-only news airing at the same time on its Decades (TV network) (formerly CW) digital subchannel.

In September 2016, WZAW moved from virtual channel 55 and RF channel 31 to RF and virtual channel 33. In 2017, its simulcast on WSAW-DT3 was upgraded to high definition to provide full-market access to Fox programming in HD.

Subchannels
The station's digital signal is multiplexed:

Nearby channel WRJT-LD, which also broadcasts on subchannels of 34, is not affiliated with WZAW or Gray Television.

References

External links

Television channels and stations established in 2015
ZAW-LD
MeTV affiliates
Movies! affiliates
Heroes & Icons affiliates
Gray Television
2015 establishments in Wisconsin
Fox network affiliates
Low-power television stations in the United States